"Mind, Body and Soul" is a song written and originally recorded by Detroit-based R&B group the Flaming Ember in 1969. It was the first of three singles released from their Westbound #9 LP.

The song reached number 26 on the U.S. Billboard Hot 100 and number 19 on Cash Box. In Canada, it spent two weeks at number 13.

Chart history

References

External links
 Lyrics of this song
 

1969 singles
1969 songs
Soul ballads
Rhythm and blues ballads
Songs written by Ron Dunbar
Songs written by Holland–Dozier–Holland